Akalla is a district in Rinkeby-Kista borough, Stockholm, Sweden. Akalla has a population of roughly 9.100 as of 2018, in which immigrants, mostly from Asia and Africa, make up 60,4% of the population.

Akalla is located on the blue metro line. Modern Akalla, with its concrete apartment buildings, as well as smaller houses, was constructed in the mid-1970s as a part of the Million Programme. The suburb is built close to, and named after an old farm from the 17th century. The name of Akalla is known from 1323. Between 1905 and 1970, the area was used by the Swedish Army as training grounds. The street names in Akalla are Finland related. The main street is called Sibeliusgången, in honour of the Finnish composer Jean Sibelius, and it is reserved for pedestrians only.

Right outside Akalla is Barkarby Airport, until its closure in 2010 Sweden's oldest active airport, due to Barkarby Amma M Nid Programme

See also
Akalla metro station

References

Districts in Västerort
Metropolitan Stockholm